R to V is the upcoming fourth concert tour headlined by South Korean girl group Red Velvet, in support of their extended plays from The ReVe Festival 2022 series; Feel My Rhythm (2022) and Birthday (2022). Announced in March 2023 by SM Entertainment, the tour is the group's first concert tour in three years since their third tour La Rouge in 2019-2020, and following the cancellation of The ReVe Festival: Prologue in 2022 due to the group's members were infected with COVID-19.

Background
Members of Red Velvet have been hinting on their next concert tour since late 2022 through their fans-community such as Bubble. On March 3, 2023, SM Entertainment announced that Red Velvet will hold their fourth solo concert in title "R to V", which come from lyrics in their 2022-single "Birthday", schedule to perform the first two shows in Seoul on April 1-2, 2023, at KSPO Dome, marking Red Velvet's first time to perform at the arena, and is their biggest South Korea concert venue since their first tour Red Room (2017-2018), with their show in April 2 will be broadcast through Beyond Live as well.

The two shows in Japan was announced on the same day as the Seoul shows, schedule to perform at Yokohama on May 3-4, 2023.

Shows

Notes

References

2023 concert tours
Concert tours of South Korea